Adriaan Jacobus Botha was a South African flying ace of World War II, credited with 5 kills.

He was shot down south of Bir Hacheim by a Bf -109 from I/JG27 on 14 June 1941.

References

South African World War II flying aces
1921 births
1941 deaths
South African Air Force personnel of World War II
South African military personnel killed in World War II
Aviators killed by being shot down